Alexander Ødegaard (born 13 September 1980, in Voss) is a Norwegian former footballer. He played four times for the Norwegian national team, scoring one goal, and has played professionally for Sogndal, Rosenborg, Viking and  French club Metz.

Career

Ødegaard started his career with Førde IL. He left Førde and joined Sogndal IL in January 2001. Ødegaard was one of the 1980 generation players to break into the first team of Sogndal. After a successful 2004 season where he scored 15 league goals for Sogndal, and made his international debut for Norway, his services were wanted by Brann and Rosenborg. He chose the 13-in-a-row league champions Rosenborg, but his first season was a disappointment, as Rosenborg failed to win the title. After the season, he was sold to Viking in a deal worth €875,000.

On 24 January 2011, he signed a two-and-a-half-year deal with French side Metz in Ligue 2.

In August 2012, Ødegaard returned to Norway, where he signed for his youth club – the Third Division side Førde.

Career statistics

International goals

Notes

References

External links

 
 RBKweb profile 

1980 births
Living people
People from Voss
Kniksen Award winners
Norwegian footballers
Norway international footballers
Norway under-21 international footballers
Norway youth international footballers
Association football wingers
Association football forwards
Sogndal Fotball players
Rosenborg BK players
Viking FK players
FC Metz players
Eliteserien players
Norwegian First Division players
Norwegian Second Division players
Norwegian Third Division players
Ligue 2 players
Norwegian expatriate footballers
Expatriate footballers in France
Norwegian expatriate sportspeople in France
Sportspeople from Vestland